The Atlanta Dream are an American professional basketball team based in Atlanta, playing in the Eastern Conference in the Women's National Basketball Association (WNBA). The team was founded for the 2008 WNBA season. The team is owned by real estate investors Larry Gottesdiener, Suzanne Abair and former Dream player Renee Montgomery. Although the Dream share the Atlanta market with the National Basketball Association's Hawks, the Dream is not affiliated with its NBA counterpart. The Dream play at the Gateway Center Arena in College Park, Georgia.

The Dream has qualified for the WNBA Playoffs in eight of its thirteen years in Atlanta and has reached the WNBA Finals three times. The franchise has been home to many high-quality players such as University of Louisville standouts Angel McCoughtry and Shoni Schimmel, former Finals MVP Betty Lennox, and Brazilian sharpshooter Izi Castro Marques. In 2010, the Dream went to the WNBA Finals but fell short to Seattle. They lost to the Minnesota Lynx in the 2011 and 2013 WNBA Finals.

Franchise history

Joining the League (2008)
Before the success of the United States women's basketball team in the 1996 Olympic Games, the American Basketball League had interest in placing a women's professional basketball team in Atlanta as early as 1995. Eight of the twelve Olympians played on ABL teams when the league began play in October 1996. The Atlanta Glory played at Forbes Arena and lasted two seasons before folding before the start of the 1998–99 season, which would be the ABL's final.

Atlanta had been mentioned as a possible future city for WNBA expansion, but efforts did not come together until the beginning of 2007 when an organizing committee with Atlanta businesswomen/men and politicians began the effort to attract an expansion team.  The inability of the Atlanta Hawks of the NBA to draw crowds was a concern of the WNBA, and the committee kicked off an effort in February 2007 to gain volunteers and petition signatures. Philips Arena (now State Farm Arena), the Gwinnett Arena (now Infinite Energy Arena) and Alexander Memorial Coliseum (now McCamish Pavilion) were candidates for venues.  By May 2007, the committee had over 1,000 pledges for season tickets, although the goal was 8,000 season tickets in ninety days. By July the committee had 1,200 commitments and began searching for an owner.

On October 16, 2007, it was reported that Ron Terwilliger, an Atlanta businessman and CEO of a national real estate company would be the future owner of an Atlanta franchise.  The next day, at a news conference at Atlanta's Centennial Olympic Park, WNBA president Donna Orender made the announcement that Atlanta would officially be granted a WNBA expansion franchise.

On November 27, 2007, Atlanta named Marynell Meadors, a coach with extensive experience at the college level, the first head coach and general manager in franchise history.  This was Meadors' second role as a coach/general manager in the WNBA following a stint with the Charlotte Sting.  Afterwards, Meadors had served as a scouting director for the Miami Sol and had been an assistant coach under Richie Adubato and Tree Rollins for the Washington Mystics. Former NBA player Dennis Rodman volunteered his name as head coach for the Dream.  Terwilliger declined, stating that he wanted someone with more coaching experience and he felt that the head coach should be a woman, as the WNBA was a women's league.

On December 5, 2007, an online contest was announced for people to vote on the team name and team colors, while the final choice rested with owner Ron Terwilliger.  The names offered as choices were "Dream", "Flight", "Surge" and "Sizzle". On January 23, 2008, the team name was announced as the Dream, inspired by the famous speech of Atlanta native Martin Luther King Jr., and the team colors were sky blue, red, and white.

Atlanta held their expansion draft on February 6, 2008 when they selected one player from each of the 13 teams in the league. Atlanta traded Roneeka Hodges and their number four pick in the 2008 WNBA Draft to the Seattle Storm for Izi Castro Marques and Seattle's eighth pick in the 2008 WNBA Draft. Also, the Dream traded the 18th pick and LaToya Thomas to the Detroit Shock for Ivory Latta.

From May 17, 2008, with a season opening loss against the Connecticut Sun to July 3, 2008, with a home loss against the Houston Comets, the Dream lost 17 consecutive games, setting the WNBA all-time record for both consecutive losses and losses from opening day.  The 2006 Chicago Sky had previously lost 13 consecutive games, and the 2002 Detroit Shock had opened their season 0–13. On July 5, the Dream earned their first win in Atlanta 91–84 against the Chicago Sky, ending the losing streak. They later finished with a 4–30 record.

The Angel McCoughtry Era (2008-2019)

Not wanting a repeat of 2008, head coach and general manager Marynell Meadors acquired players such as Sancho Lyttle, Nikki Teasley, Chamique Holdsclaw, Angel McCoughtry, and Michelle Snow in the 2008–2009 offseason. In 2009, Atlanta reached the playoffs at 18–16, exceeding their previous record by 14 wins, but lost in the first round to the 2008 champion Detroit Shock in a sweep. After the season, their coach, Marynell Meadors, was awarded the Coach of the Year Award.

The Dream's owner, Ron Terwilliger, announced in August that he wanted to give up his position as the primary owner of the Atlanta franchise.  On October 29, 2009, Kathy Betty took control of the team under the business entity Dream Too, LLC.

The 2010 season saw further improvement, finishing in fourth place in the Eastern Conference. The Dream then made it through the first two rounds of the playoffs and secured a trip to the WNBA Finals with a win over the New York Liberty, as they swept New York in two games in the Eastern Conference Finals. They eventually faced the best team in the league, the 28–6 Seattle Storm. Seattle took the first two games at home with two close wins. Seattle completed the sweep and won the series in Atlanta. Even though they were swept, the Dream did not lose any game by a margin of more than three points.

Addressing arguably Atlanta's biggest concern, the team traded for All-Star point guard Lindsey Harding prior to the 2011 season. Despite the addition, the Dream struggled to open the season, starting with a 2–7 record due to an injury that sidelined Angel McCoughtry and overseas commitments by Sancho Lyttle. The team then went on a run of 14 wins and 5 losses after the All-Star break. They carried that momentum into the playoffs, sweeping the Connecticut Sun and defeating the Indiana Fever to return to the WNBA Finals.  However, they lost to the 27–7 Minnesota Lynx in three games.

During the 2011 season, Betty sold Dream Too LLC to local investors Mary Brock and Kelly Loeffler.

The Dream started the 2012 season with a 12–12 record and fired head coach and general manager Meadors during a dispute with league-leading scorer Angel McCoughtry. Meadors was replaced by Fred Williams, finished with a 19–15 record, and lost in the first round.

The following 2013 season, the team again made it to the WNBA Finals, and again were swept by the Lynx. Williams' contract was not renewed.

Michael Cooper was then hired for the 2014 season. He led the team to the playoffs in 2014 and 2016, but was fired after failing to make the playoffs in 2017.

On October 30, 2017, the Dream hired Nicki Collen as their new head coach. Collen came over to Atlanta after serving as an assistant coach for the Connecticut Sun. Collen helped the Dream finish first in the Eastern Conference in 2018, finishing with an 23-11 record. They ultimately ended up losing in the Semifinals that year.

2019 was a struggle for the Dream. Angel McCoughtry was still recovering from her ACL tear that occurred during the 2018 year. Tiffany Hayes and Brittney Sykes were bright spots - both averaging in double figures for the year. But that wasn't enough, the Dream finished with the worst record in the Eastern Conference with a 8-26 record. With the WNBA's lottery system of 2-year combine records, the Dream had the worst shot at receiving the top pick in the 2020 WNBA Draft and they received the 4th Overall Pick.

Rebranding and Turmoil (2020-2021)
On October 18, 2019, the Dream unveiled an updated logo and color scheme, the first change to their branding since the team's inception in 2008.

Star Angel McCoughtry announced that she wasn't going to return to the Dream in the 2020 season - choosing to sign with the Las Vegas Aces. This began the transformation of the new look Dream. Tiffany Hayes and Renee Montgomery announced that they would be sitting out the "bubble" season - leaving Elizabeth Williams as the only starter coming back from the last two seasons. The Dream selected young star guard Chennedy Carter in the 2020 WNBA Draft to start the rebuild.

The Dream played slightly better in 2020 compared to 2019, but still missed the playoffs with a 7-15 record and were the third worst team in the league. Shortly after the George Floyd protests began, the WNBA and player's union decided to put Black Lives Matter and Say Her Name slogans on warmup gear and opening weekend uniforms. By then, team owner Kelly Loeffler was a Republican U.S. Senator, and she criticized the league's support for Black Lives Matter. At the next game, Dream players wore black T-shirts with the slogan "VOTE WARNOCK", endorsing her election opponent Raphael Warnock, an African-American pastor who then defeated Loeffler. The player's union then demanded that Loeffler sell her stake in the team. A three-member investor group, including former Atlanta Dream guard Renee Montgomery, were approved to purchase the team in February 2021.

Collen seemed excited for the upcoming 2021, but left the Dream to go to Baylor about a week before the season began. The Dream promoted Mike Petersen to interim head coach, but he stepped down on July 24 due to health reasons. Darius Taylor took over as interim coach through the end of the regular season.

Coaching changes weren't the only issue the Dream faced. Chennedy Carter was suspended on July 5, 2021, due to conduct detrimental to the team and never played again. The Dream's season once again put them at the bottom of the standings and missed the playoffs again. They went 8-24 during the year. Following the season, it was announced that Courtney Williams and Crystal Bradford would not be re-signed due to their roles in an altercation off the court. The league announced that they would be suspended for a couple games in the 2022 season.

The Dream and Carter could not work out their differences from the following season, and on February 5, 2022, the Dream traded her to the Los Angeles Sparks in exchange for Erica Wheeler and some draft picks.

The Rhyne Howard Era (2022-Present)
Tasked with trying to turn the team around, the Dream hired Tanisha Wright as their new head coach on October 12, 2021. Wright had played in the league for 12 years and had most recently been an assistant under Bill Laimbeer of the Las Vegas Aces. Wright hired Christie Sides, Paul Goriss, and Barbara Turner to her staff in March of 2022.

The Dream also announced some new partners and sponsors for the upcoming season. Microsoft and Xbox were announced on April 5, 2022. The Dream also announced Emory Healthcare as the first-ever marquee jersey partner. The expanded partnership was put on display as the Emory Healthcare logo made its debut on the Dream’s jerseys during the 2022 season.

The Dream began looking for their next face of the franchise and acquire the 1st Overall Pick in the 2022 WNBA Draft from the Washington Mystics on April 6, 2022.  They selected Rhyne Howard out of Kentucky as the 1st Overall Pick. Howard was a three-time AP All-America First Team selection, averaged 20.5 points, 7.4 rebounds and 3.3 assists as a senior.

Arenas
The Dream played at Philips Arena, now known as State Farm Arena, in downtown Atlanta, shared with the Atlanta Hawks from 2008 to 2016. In 2013, the team qualified for the WNBA Finals, but a scheduling conflict forced them to play home games at The Arena at Gwinnett Center, now known as Gas South Arena, in suburban Duluth. Due to renovations to Philips Arena during the Hawks' 2017 and 2018 offseasons, the Dream played home games at McCamish Pavilion on the campus of the Georgia Institute of Technology.

The team returned to the renovated and renamed State Farm Arena for the 2019 season. Following the conclusion of the 2019 WNBA regular season, team officials indicated that the Dream would not be returning to State Farm Arena for the 2020 season, citing disagreements with the Hawks' management. The team announced on October 18, 2019, coinciding with their rebranding, they would move to the new Gateway Center Arena in nearby College Park for the 2020 season (later delayed to the 2021 season), sharing the arena with the Hawks' NBA G League affiliate, the College Park Skyhawks.

Season-by-season records

Players

Current roster

Other rights owned

Former players
Izi Castro Marques (2008–2011)
Érika de Souza (2008–2015)
Katie Feenstra-Mattera (2008)
Lindsey Harding (2011–2012)
Chamique Holdsclaw (2009) 
Ivory Latta (2008–2009)
Shalee Lehning (2009–2011)
Betty Lennox (2008)
Camille Little (2008)
Sancho Lyttle (2009-2017)
Kristen Mann (2008)
Angel McCoughtry (2009-2019)
Coco Miller (2009–2011)
DeLisha Milton-Jones (2014–2015)
Shoni Schimmel (2014–2015)
Michelle Snow (2009)
Nikki Teasley (2008)

Coaches and staff

Owners
Ron Terwilliger (2008–2009)
Kathy Betty (2010)
Dream Too LLC, composed of Mary Brock and Kelly Loeffler (2011–2021)
Larry Gottesdiener, Suzanne Abair, and Renee Montgomery (2021–present)

Executives
President & COO - Bill Bolen (2008- 2009) 
Co-owner & CEO - Kathy Betty (2010-2011)
CEO – Peter J. Canalichio (2012)
CEO - Ashley Preisinger (2012-2014)
President & CEO - Theresa Wenzel (2014–2016) 
President & General Manager - Chris Sienko (2017–2021)
President & COO - Morgan Shaw Parker (2022-present)

Head coaches

General managers
Marynell Meadors (2008–2012)
Fred Williams (2012–2013)
Angela Taylor (2014–2016)
Chris Sienko (2017–2021)
Dan Padover (2021–present)

Assistant coaches
Katy Steding (2008)
Fred Williams (2008–2012)
Sue Panek (2008–2011)
Carol Ross (2009–2011)
Joe Ciampi (2012–2013)
Julie Plank (2013)
Karleen Thompson (2013–2017)
Teresa Edwards (2014)
Tellis Frank (2015)
Miles Cooper (2016–2017)
Mike Petersen (2017–2020)
Darius Taylor (2017–2021)
La'Keshia Frett (2021–2022)
Daynia La-Force (2021–2022)
Christie Sides (2022)
Paul Goriss (2022–present)
Barbara Turner (2022–present)
Vickie Johnson (2023–present)

Statistics

|-
| 2008
| B. Lennox (17.5)
| E. de Souza (6.6)
| I. Latta (3.6)
| 74.5 vs 84.7
| 31.7 vs 37.2
| .396 vs .450
|-
| 2009
| I. Castro Marques (14.4)
| E. de Souza (9.1)
| S. Lehning (3.7)
| 84.1 vs 82.3
| 37.0 vs 34.5
| .449 vs .421
|-

|-
| 2010
| A. McCoughtry (21.1)
| S. Lyttle (9.9)
| S. Lehning (4.8)
| 85.4 vs 83.1
| 38.8 vs 34.1
| .444 vs .435
|-
| 2011
| A. McCoughtry (21.6)
| E. de Souza (7.5)
| L. Harding (4.8)
| 82.5 vs 80.8
| 36.1 vs 34.6
| .446 vs .431
|-
| 2012
| A. McCoughtry (21.4)
| E. de Souza (8.2)
| L. Harding (4.5)
| 78.6 vs 75.8
| 34.8 vs 34.5
| .434 vs .415
|-
| 2013
| A. McCoughtry (21.5)
| E. de Souza (9.9)
| A. McCoughtry (4.4)
| 76.9 vs 75.4
| 35.6 vs 35.7
| .423 vs .420
|-
| 2014
| A. McCoughtry (18.5)
| S. Lyttle (9.0)
| C. Dumerc (4.0)
| 80.6 vs 78.6
| 37.7 vs 34.3
| .433 vs .429
|-
| 2015
| A. McCoughtry (20.1)
| S. Lyttle (8.3)
| S. Schimmel (3.2)
| 77.8 vs 79.8
| 34.6 vs 32.1
| .411 vs .436
|-
| 2016
| A. McCoughtry (19.5)
| E. Williams (8.1)
| L. Clarendon (3.5)
| 81.8 vs 84.0
| 36.5 vs 34.9
| .422 vs .435
|-
| 2017
| T. Hayes (16.3)
| E. Williams (7.2)
| L. Clarendon (6.6)
| 78.9 vs 82.7
| 35.1 vs 36.0
| .409 vs .438
|-
| 2018
| T. Hayes (17.2)
| J. Breland (7.9)
| R. Montgomery (3.7)
| 81.8 vs 79.5 
| 35.8 vs 36.5
| .426 vs .423
|-
| 2019
| T. Hayes (14.7)
| J. Breland (7.3)
| A. Bentley (3.0)
| 71.2 vs 78.9
| 36.1 vs 39.5
| .371 vs .416
|-

|-
| 2020
| C. Carter (17.4)
| M. Billings (8.5)
| B. Laney (4.0)
| 81.0 vs 87.6
| 34.9 vs 35.0
| .442 vs .457
|-
| 2021
| C. Williams (16.5)
| C. Williams (6.8)
| C. Williams (4.0)
| 78.7 vs 84.3
| 24.4 vs 29.6
| .417 vs .457
|-
| 2022
| R. Howard (16.2)
| M. Billings (6.3)
| E. Wheeler (3.9)
| 78.5 vs 81.5
| 35.5 vs 33.9
| .420 vs .432

Media coverage
Currently, some Dream games are broadcast on Bally Sports Southeast and Bally Sports South. All games (excluding blackout games, which are available on ESPN3.com) are broadcast to the WNBA LiveAccess game feeds on the league website. Furthermore, some Dream games are broadcast nationally on ESPN, ESPN2 and ABC. The WNBA has reached an eight-year agreement with ESPN, which will pay right fees to the Dream, as well as other teams in the league.

All-time notes

Regular season attendance
 A sellout for a basketball game at State Farm Arena has differed slightly throughout its history:
 18,729 from 2008 to 2011
 18,371 in 2012
 18,238 in 2013
 18,118 in 2014
 18,047 in 2015 and 2016
 16,600 in 2019
 A sellout for a basketball game at McCamish Pavilion has been 8,600 since 2012, before the Dream temporarily moved in for 2017 and 2018.
 A sellout for a basketball game at the Gateway Center Arena is 3,500 since 2021.

Draft picks
2008 Expansion Draft: Carla Thomas, Érika de Souza, Katie Feenstra, Roneeka Hodges, Ann Strother, LaToya Thomas, Kristen Mann, Ann Wauters, Jennifer Lacy, Kristin Haynie, Chantelle Anderson, Betty Lennox, Yelena Leuchanka
2008: Tamera Young (8), Morenike Atunrase (24), Danielle Hood (32)
2009 Houston Dispersal Draft: Sancho Lyttle (1)
2009: Angel McCoughtry (1), Shalee Lehning (25), Jessica Morrow (27)
2010 Sacramento Dispersal Draft: selection waived
2010: Chanel Mokango (9), Brigitte Ardossi (21), Brittainey Raven (33)
2011: Ta'Shia Phillips (8), Rachel Jarry (18), Kelsey Bolte (32)
2012: Tiffany Hayes (14), Isabelle Yacoubou (32, ineligible)
2013: Alex Bentley (13), Anne Marie Armstrong (31)
2014: Shoni Schimmel (8), Inga Orekhova (18), Cassie Harberts (20)
2015: Samantha Logic (10), Ariel Massengale (29), Lauren Okafor (34)
2016: Bria Holmes (9), Rachel Hollivay (13), Courtney Walker (16), Niya Johnson (28)
2017: Brittney Sykes (7), Jordan Reynolds (19), Oderah Chidom (31)
2018: Monique Billings (15), Kristy Wallace (16), Mackenzie Engram (27)
2019: Brianna Turner (11), Maite Cazorla (23), Li Yueru (35)
2020: Chennedy Carter (4), Brittany Brewer (17), Mikayla Pivec (25), Kobi Thornton (27)
2021: Aari McDonald (3), Raquel Carrera (15), Lindsey Pulliam (27)
2022: Rhyne Howard (1), Naz Hillmon (15)

Trades
February 6, 2008: The Dream traded LaToya Thomas and the 18th pick in the 2008 WNBA draft to the Detroit Shock in exchange for Ivory Latta.
February 6, 2008: The Dream traded the fourth pick in the 2008 WNBA draft and Roneeka Hodges to the Seattle Storm for Izi Castro Marques and the eighth pick in the draft.
February 6, 2008: The Dream acquired the 24th pick in the 2008 WNBA draft from the Indiana Fever in exchange for agreeing not to select specific unprotected Fever players in the expansion draft.
April 9, 2008: The Dream traded Ann Wauters, draft rights to Morenike Atunrase, and a second-round pick in the 2009 WNBA draft to the San Antonio Silver Stars in exchange for Camille Little, draft rights to Chioma Nnamaka, and a first-round pick in the 2009 WNBA draft.
June 22, 2008: The Dream traded Camille Little to the Seattle Storm in exchange for a second-round pick in the 2009 WNBA draft.
July 4, 2008: The Dream traded Kristen Mann to the Indiana Fever in exchange for Alison Bales.
December 17, 2008: The Dream traded the 13th pick in the 2009 WNBA draft to the Los Angeles Sparks in exchange for the rights to Chamique Holdsclaw.
January 21, 2009: The Dream traded Alison Bales to the Phoenix Mercury in exchange for the 18th pick in the 2009 Draft.
April 9, 2009: The Dream traded the 18th pick in the 2009 WNBA draft to the Detroit Shock in exchange for Ashley Shields.
August 12, 2009: The Dream traded Tamera Young to the Chicago Sky in exchange for Armintie Price.
March 11, 2010: The Dream traded Michelle Snow to the San Antonio Silver Stars in exchange for Dalma Ivanyi and the right to swap second-round picks in the 2010 Draft.
April 11, 2011: The Dream traded Rachel Jarry and second-round pick in 2012 WNBA draft to the Minnesota Lynx in exchange for Felicia Chester.
April 11, 2011: The Dream traded Ta'Shia Phillips, Kelly Miller and first-round pick in 2012 WNBA draft to the Washington Mystics in exchange for Lindsey Harding and second-round pick in 2012 Draft.
February 19, 2013: The Dream traded the 7th and 19th pick in the 2013 WNBA draft to the Washington Mystics in exchange for Jasmine Thomas and second-round pick in 2013 Draft.
March 12, 2014: The Dream traded Alex Bentley and the 32nd pick in the 2014 WNBA draft to the Connecticut Sun in exchange for Matee Ajavon and the 18th pick in the 2014 Draft from the Washington Mystics.
May 7, 2014: The Dream traded Courtney Clements to the Chicago Sky in exchange for Swin Cash.
July 9, 2014: The Dream traded Swin Cash to the New York Liberty in exchange for DeLisha Milton-Jones.
April 16, 2015: The Dream traded Jasmine Thomas to the Connecticut Sun in exchange for Brittany Hrynko.
July 27, 2015: The Dream traded Érika de Souza to the Chicago Sky in exchange for Damiris Dantas, Reshanda Gray, and a first-round pick in 2016 Draft from the Minnesota Lynx. Minnesota received Sylvia Fowles and a second-round pick in 2016 WNBA draft from Chicago as part of this trade.
February 3, 2016: The Dream traded the 4th pick in the 2016 Draft to the Connecticut Sun in exchange for Elizabeth Williams.
May 2, 2016: The Dream traded Shoni Schimmel to the New York Liberty in exchange for second-round pick in 2017 Draft.
January 26, 2017: The Dream traded Reshanda Gray to the Connecticut Sun in exchange for Aneika Henry-Morello.
April 12, 2018: The Dream receive 15th pick in 2018 WNBA draft and a second-round pick in 2019 WNBA draft in exchange for Bria Holmes.
July 9, 2018: The Dream receive Alex Bentley in exchange for Layshia Clarendon and a second-round pick in 2019 WNBA draft.
May 16, 2019: The Dream receive Dallas' third-round pick in the 2020 WNBA draft in exchange for Imani McGee-Stafford.
February 10, 2020: The Dream traded Brittney Sykes and Marie Gülich to Los Angeles in exchange for Kalani Brown.
February 19, 2020: The Dream traded Jessica Breland and Nia Coffey to Phoenix as part of a three-way trade with Connecticut in exchange for Courtney Williams and the 17th pick in the 2020 WNBA draft.
February 21, 2021: The Dream traded their third-round pick in the 2022 Draft in exchange for Yvonne Turner.
January 31, 2022: The Dream traded a third-round pick in the 2023 Draft to the Phoenix Mercury in exchange for Kia Vaughn.
February 5, 2022: The Dream traded Chennedy Carter and the rights to Li Yueru to the Los Angeles Sparks in exchange for Erica Wheeler, a second-round pick in the 2022 WNBA Draft, and a first-round pick in the 2023 WNBA Draft.
April 6, 2022: The Dream traded the 3rd and 14th overall picks in the 2022 WNBA Draft, and the right to swap first-round picks with the Los Angeles Sparks to the Washington Mystics in exchange for the 1st Overall Pick in the 2022 WNBA Draft.
June 8, 2022: The Dream traded Megan Walker and the rights to Raquel Carrera to the New York Liberty in exchange for AD Durr.

All-Stars
2008: No All-Star Game
2009: Érika de Souza, Sancho Lyttle
2010: Izi Castro Marques, Sancho Lyttle, Angel McCoughtry
2011: Angel McCoughtry
2012: No All-Star Game
2013: Angel McCoughtry, Érika de Souza
2014: Angel McCoughtry, Érika de Souza, Shoni Schimmel
2015: Angel McCoughtry, Shoni Schimmel
2016: No All-Star Game
2017: Layshia Clarendon, Tiffany Hayes, Elizabeth Williams
2018: Angel McCoughtry
2019: None Selected
2020: No All-Star Game
2021: Courtney Williams
2022: Rhyne Howard

Olympians
2012: Angel McCoughtry, Érika de Souza (BRA)
2016: Angel McCoughtry

Honors and awards

2009 Rookie of the Year: Angel McCoughtry
2009 Coach of the Year: Marynell Meadors
2009 All-Defensive Second Team: Angel McCoughtry
2009 All-Rookie Team: Angel McCoughtry
2010 All-WNBA First Team: Angel McCoughtry
2010 All-Defensive First Team: Angel McCoughtry
2010 All-Defensive Second Team: Sancho Lyttle
2011 All-WNBA First Team: Angel McCoughtry
2011 All-Defensive First Team: Angel McCoughtry
2011 All-Defensive Second Team: Sancho Lyttle and Armintie Price
2012 Peak Performer (Points): Angel McCoughtry
2012 All-Defensive First Team: Sancho Lyttle
2012 All-Defensive Second Team: Armintie Price
2012 All-Rookie Team: Tiffany Hayes
2013 All-WNBA Second Team: Angel McCoughtry
2013 All-Defensive First Team: Angel McCoughtry and Armintie Price
2013 All-Rookie Team: Alex Bentley
2014 WNBA All-Star Game MVP: Shoni Schimmel
2014 All-Defensive First Team: Angel McCoughtry and Sancho Lyttle
2014 All-WNBA Second Team: Angel McCoughtry
2015 All-Defensive First Team: Angel McCoughtry
2015 All-Defensive Second Team: Sancho Lyttle
2015 Kim Perrot Sportsmanship Award: DeLisha Milton-Jones
2015 All-WNBA First Team: Angel McCoughtry
2016 Most Improved Player: Elizabeth Williams
2016 All-Defensive First Team: Angel McCoughtry
2017 All-Rookie Team: Brittney Sykes
2018 Coach of the Year: Nicki Collen
2018 Executive of the Year: Chris Sienko
2018 All-Defensive First Team: Jessica Breland
2018 All-Defensive Second Team: Tiffany Hayes
2020 Most Improved Player: Betnijah Laney
2020 All-Rookie Team: Chennedy Carter
2020 All-Defensive First Team: Betnijah Laney, Elizabeth Williams
2022 Rookie of the Year: Rhyne Howard
2022 All-Rookie Team: Rhyne Howard

References

External links
 Article announcing new franchise
 Atlanta names Meadors Head coach/ General manager
 Atlanta announces Team Name
 Atlanta's expansion draft results

 
Women's National Basketball Association teams
Basketball teams established in 2008
Basketball teams in Georgia (U.S. state)
Sports teams in Atlanta